Masayoshi Nakatani (中谷 正義, Nakatani Masayoshi, born March 8, 1989) is a Japanese professional boxer. He held the OPBF lightweight title between 2014 and 2019, and won the WBO Inter-Continental lightweight title in 2020.

Professional career

Early career 
Nakatani fought the first 18 bouts of his professional career in his native Japan. During this time, he won the OPBF lightweight title in January 2014, and successfully defended it 11 times.

Rise up the ranks

Nakatani vs. López 
After compiling a perfect record of 18-0, Nakatani made his first appearance in the ring outside of Japan when he faced fellow undefeated contender Teófimo López on July 19, 2019 in Oxon Hill, Maryland in an eliminator for the IBF lightweight title. Nakatani lost a unanimous decision, with scores of 118-110, 118-110 and 119-109.

Nakatani vs. Verdejo 
On December 12, 2020 in Paradise, Nevada, Nakatani defeated Félix Verdejo by ninth-round technical knockout despite being down on all three scorecards at the time of the stoppage to capture the vacant WBO Inter-Continental lightweight title. The bout was an exciting one, with both men exchanging two knockdowns apiece. In his post-fight interview, Nakatani stated his desire to avenge his loss to Teófimo López, who had since become unified lightweight champion: “I fought Teófimo López before and I want to fight him again. That’s why I kept going tonight. I want to go for the knockout [in a rematch with López] like I did today."

Nakatani vs. Lomachenko 

Nakatani returned to the ring on June 26, 2021 in Paradise, Nevada to face former three-division world champion Vasiliy Lomachenko, with whom he shares a common loss to Teófimo López. Nakatani was knocked down twice en route to a ninth-round technical knockout loss.

Professional boxing record

References

External links

Living people
Japanese male boxers
Lightweight boxers
1989 births